Larry or Lawrence Mitchell may refer to:

 Larry Mitchell (author) (1939–2012), American author and publisher
 Larry Mitchell (ice hockey) (born 1967), Canadian-German ice hockey coach
 Larry Mitchell (baseball) (born 1971), pitcher in Major League Baseball
 Lawrence "Boo" Mitchell, American musician
 Tee Mitchell (Lawrence Berry Mitchell, 1916–1970), American baseball player
 John Mitchell Jr. (politician) (born 1954), known as Larry, American politician